Vulpia myuros, the annual fescue, or rat's-tail fescue, is an annual grass species of the genus Vulpia. It was probably originally native to Eurasia, but it can now be found nearly worldwide as a naturalized species.

In the United Kingdom it forms dense, even swards of fine, hair-like stems in recently disturbed habitats. It is often eventually displaced by perennial grasses.

Invasive species
Vulpia myuros is considered a noxious weed and invasive species in places where it is not native, especially in areas with a Mediterranean climate. For example, it is widespread in California, where it is now a dominant species in many types of grassy habitat.

References

External links
Jepson Manual Treatment
USDA Plants Profile
Grass Manual Treatment
Washington Burke Museum
Photo gallery

Pooideae
Grasses of Asia
Grasses of Europe
Flora of Western Asia
Plants described in 1753
Taxa named by Carl Linnaeus